Jean-Marie Domenach (13 February 1922 – 5 July 1997) was a French writer and intellectual. He was noted as a left-wing and Catholic thinker.

Domenach was born in Lyon, where he studied at the Lycée du Parc. In 1957, he took over the editorship of Esprit, the literary and political journal of personalism founded in 1945 by Emmanuel Mounier and followed (from 1950 to 1957) by Albert Béguin. Domenach voluntarily retired from Esprit at age 54 and began writing and teaching at the university level. Opposed to torture during the Algerian War, he also held a meeting denouncing the 1961 Paris massacre. He died in Paris, aged 75.

Works
Gilbert Dru: celui qui croyait au ciel (1947)
La propagande politique (1950)
Communism in Western Europe (1951; with Mario Einaudi and Aldo Garosci)
Barrès par lui-même (1954)
Yougoslavie (1960; with Alain Pontault) 
Le retour du tragique (1963)
The Catholic Avant-Garde: French Catholicism Since World War II (1967; with Robert de Montvalon) 
Il vicolo cieco della sinistra (1970; with Thomas Molnar and Augusto Del Noce)
Emmanuel Mounier (1972)
Le christianisme éclaté (1974; with Michel de Certeau)
Le Sauvage et l' Ordinateur (1976)
Ce que je crois (1978)
L’autogestion c’est pas de la tarte (Maquis du Vercors) (1978; with Marcel Mermoz) 
Malraux (1979) with others
Enquête sur idées contemporaines (1981)
La Violence et ses causes (Unesco, 1980) as Violence and its Causes (1981)
Lettre à mes ennemis de classe (1984)
Des idées pour la politique (1988) 
Ce qu'il faut enseigner: pour un nouvel enseignement général dans le secondaire (1989)
Approches de la modernité (1990)
Europe: le défi culturel (1990)
À temps et à contretemps (1991)
Une morale sans moralisme (1992)
La responsabilité, essai sur le fondement du civisme (1994)
Le crépuscule de la culture française? (1995)
Regarder la France. Essai sur le malaise français  (1997)
Gilbert Dru, un chrétien résistant (1998; with Bernard Comte, Christian Rendu, and Denise Rendu) 
Beaucoup de gueule et peu d'or. Journal d'un réfractaire (1944–1977) (2001)

References

 "Jean-Marie Domenach" – Article in the Encyclopédie de l'Agora

1922 births
1997 deaths
Writers from Lyon
Roman Catholic writers
French male essayists
20th-century French essayists
20th-century French male writers
20th-century French journalists